Aziz Salihu (born 1 May 1954 in Pristina, Kosovo) is one of the best retired Super heavyweight boxer of Kosovar Albanian descent. He represented Yugoslavia at the 1984 Summer Olympics in Los Angeles, California, and won the bronze medal in the super heavyweight division (> 91 kg), after a loss in the semifinals at the hands of Tyrell Biggs of the United States. Salihu also competed at the 1980 (Moscow) and 1988 Summer Olympics in Seoul, South Korea, where he was eliminated in the quarterfinals.

Career
Salihu is celebrated in Kosovo and in amateur boxing circles for his more than five hundred official matches among which he lost only 26. On club level Aziz had his best years while boxing for Pristina. He was part of the so-called golden generation and won eight Yugoslav championship titles (five consecutive). He won international medals in many other championships, including first places in the Mediterranean games and the World Cup in 1987. In Kosovo, he received the Sportsman of the Century Award and now works as the coach and manager of Boxing Club Pristina.

1980 Olympic results
Below is the record of Aziz Salihu, a Yugoslavian heavyweight boxer who competed at the 1980 Moscow Olympics:

 Round of 16: lost to Pyotr Zayev (Soviet Union) by decision, 0-5

Opponents

He defeated boxer world and European champion Alexander Yagubkin in the tournament final in Belgrade (1980). In the tournament final in Belgrade (1984) he defeated the former world champion from Russia, Valery Abadzhyan. He beat world champion Francesco Damiani in an international tournament in Benghazi in Libya (1984). He beat Craig Payne, Ferenc Somodi, Håkan Brock, Marvis Frazier, Peter Hussing and Biaggio Chianese.

Notes and references
Notes:

References:

External links
 databaseOlympics.com

1954 births
Living people
Kosovan male boxers
Heavyweight boxers
Boxers at the 1980 Summer Olympics
Boxers at the 1984 Summer Olympics
Boxers at the 1988 Summer Olympics
Olympic boxers of Yugoslavia
Olympic bronze medalists for Yugoslavia
Sportspeople from Pristina
Olympic medalists in boxing
Yugoslav male boxers
Medalists at the 1984 Summer Olympics
Mediterranean Games gold medalists for Yugoslavia
Competitors at the 1987 Mediterranean Games
Mediterranean Games medalists in boxing